Ghilianella beckeri is a species of assassin bug in the subfamily Emesinae found in Brazil. The species was described in 2009 and was found in the collection of the late professor Johann Becker (1932–2004).

References

Reduviidae
Arthropods of Brazil
Insects described in 2009